Franciszek Żwirko [english pronunciation like: frantsishek zhvirko] (16 September 1895 – 11 September 1932) was a prominent Polish sport and military aviator. Along with Stanisław Wigura, he won the international air contest Challenge 1932.

He was born in Sventiany, near Vilnius in Lithuania (at that time part of the Russian Empire), and attended school in Vilnius. During World War I, he volunteered for the Russian Army, graduated from an officer school in Irkutsk, and served in infantry, fighting against the Germans. He was awarded the Order of St. Anna, 4th class. In 1917, he joined the Polish corps of Gen. Józef Dowbor-Muśnicki, formed in Russia. After the corps was disbanded in 1918, he enlisted in Gen. Anton Denikin's Volunteer Army and fought against the Bolsheviks in the Russian Civil War. He completed an air observer course. After the Bolsheviks' victory in the war in 1921, Żwirko fought his way to Poland across the Soviet-Polish border.

In Poland, he completed an aviation school in Bydgoszcz in November 1923, and a higher pilotage school in Grudziądz. He became a fighter pilot in the 18th Fighter Squadron of the 1st Air Regiment, with a rank of porucznik pilot (flying lieutenant). He also became active in sports aviation. Żwirko distinguished himself as a very skilled and calm pilot. In August 1927, flying a Breguet 19 military plane, he took the 2nd place in the 1st air contest of the Little Entente and Poland in Yugoslavia, and the 1st place in its rally part. From 1929 he was assigned as a liaison officer in the University Aeroclub (Aeroklub Akademicki) in Warsaw.

Thanks to his new post, he could increase his sporting activity, meeting young aviation enthusiasts - mostly students of Warsaw University of Technology. He especially made friends with young engineer Stanislaw Wigura, one of the designers of the RWD team. They often flew together from then, Wigura as a mechanic and second pilot. Between 9 August and 6 September 1929, Żwirko and Wigura flew the RWD-2 prototype across Europe, on Warsaw–Paris–Barcelona–Milan–Warsaw  route, and on October 6 they won in the 1st Rally of South-Eastern Poland.

In July 1930, Żwirko and Wigura took part in the International Tourist Plane Competition Challenge 1930, flying the RWD-4, but they had to withdraw on July 25 due to engine failure, after an emergency landing in Spain. In September and October 1930, they won two contests in Poland (the 2nd Rally of South-Eastern Poland flying RWD-2 and the 3rd Light Aircraft Contest, flying RWD-4), and in October 1931 they won the 4th Touring Planes Contest, flying on a prototype RWD-5.

In December 1931, Żwirko was assigned a training escadre commander in an aviation school in Dęblin. In April 1932 he was selected for the Polish team for the International Tourist Plane Competition Challenge 1932, taking place between August 20-August 28, 1932, and he chose Wigura as his crewmate. They won the competition, over favourite German and other teams, flying the new RWD-6, and became heroes in Poland. The success was brought by Żwirko's pilotage skills and high quality of the plane, designed among others, by Wigura.

On 11 September 1932, while flying to an air meeting in Prague, Żwirko and Wigura fatally crashed in their RWD-6 in the forest at Cierlicko, near Cieszyn in Czechoslovakia, when the wing broke in a heavy storm. The two men were buried in the Avenue of the Meritorious in Powązki Cemetery in Warsaw.

Honours and awards 
On 14 September 1932, the President of Poland posthumously awarded Żwirko the Knight's Cross of the Order of Polonia Restituta "for his contribution in the field of propaganda in the international aviation" and, on March 12, 1933, he received a posthumous promotion to the captain with seniority from 1 January 1933.

He had also been decorated with the Gold and Silver Crosses of Merit and the Russian Order of St. Anna, class IV (combat merit).

References 

 
 

1895 births
1932 deaths
Aviators killed in aviation accidents or incidents
Burials at Powązki Cemetery
People from Švenčionys
People from Vilna Governorate
Polish Army officers
Knights of the Order of Polonia Restituta
Recipients of the Order of St. Anna, 4th class
Recipients of the Gold Cross of Merit (Poland)
Polish aviation record holders
Victims of aviation accidents or incidents in Czechoslovakia
Victims of aviation accidents or incidents in 1932